Angela Ruth Hart (born 8 March 1972), billed as Angie Hart, is an Australian pop singer best known for her role as lead vocalist in the alternative pop rock band Frente! and the indie pop duo Splendid with her then husband Jesse Tobias. Hart's solo career commenced in 2006 with the release the album, Grounded Bird  (2007).

Career

1972-1989: Early life
Born in Adelaide, South Australia, she has an older sister, Rebecca, also a musician. Her parents were Christians from a missionary background. The family moved to Tasmania while Hart was still a baby where they lived in a Christian commune until she was 10 years old. They then moved to Melbourne to join another commune where they remained until Hart was 15 when, with the separation of her parents, the family left the church altogether.

It was this family disruption which led Hart to the Punters Club, a live music venue on Brunswick Street in Fitzroy, one of Melbourne's eclectic and bohemian inner suburbs. She frequented the venue to play pool and drink, though she was still under the legal drinking age. It often fell to bartender Simon Austin to eject her from the premises. Hart's older sister was also bartending at the Punters Club in 1989 and when Austin, a guitarist and songwriter, mentioned he was starting a band and looking for a singer, Becky Hart suggested her little sister Angie. Austin and Hart began writing songs together almost immediately, and with the already-recruited bass player Tim O'Connor and drummer Mark Picton, Frente! was born.

In 1990, she co-wrote the song "Marshall" with the Melbourne post-punk band Man in the Wood's bassist and drummer, Owen Bolwell and Stanley Paulzen. In 1991, the band, by then renamed to Tlot Tlot, recorded the song with Hart on vocals which appeared on the album A Day at the Bay

1989-1997: Frente!

Frente! were formed in Melbourne in 1989 by Simon Austin on guitar and backing vocals, Tim O'Connor on bass guitar, Mark Picton on drums and recorder and Angie Hart on lead vocals. 

In August 1991, Frente! self-released their debut EP, Whirled, which featured the song "Labour of Love". "Labour of Love" achieved national airplay on Australia's youth radio station Triple J and ranked highly in the Triple J Hottest 100, 1991. Subsequently, Frente! were signed to Mushroom Records' White label. In 1992, the group released the top 5 single, " Kelly Street", top 5 EP Clunk (EP) and top 5 album Marvin the Album. The group won two ARIA Awards at the ARIA Music Awards of 1993.

In 1993 Hart gained brief fame and notoriety by posing near nude for Juice, a now-defunct Australian music magazine . Following an appearance on Home and Away in 1993, Hart, with the rest of Frente!, went overseas to pursue success in Europe and America and achieved success with the cover version of New Order's "Bizarre Love Triangle".

In 1995, Hart lent her vocal to the single "Tingly" by an Australian studio outfit, Pop! featuring Angie Hart. The song was peaked at number 92 on the ARIA Charts.

In March 1996 Hart appeared on the album More of Her by "Melbourne supergroup" Four Hours Sleep, with Frente's new bassist Bill McDonald, plus Stephen Cummings, Peter Luscombe and Dan Luscombe.

In July 1996, Frente! released their second studio album, Shape, which failed to match the success of their debut. Frente! embarked on a world tour to promote Shape, beginning in Australia in July 1996. In January 1997, following an appearance at Melbourne's Big Day Out, the band went their separate ways.

In 1997, Hart collaborated with The Angel for the single "Anything", before leaving Australia for the US.

1998-2005: USA, Marriage, Splendid and Holiday on Ice

From 1998 to 2004, Hart performed as part of the pop duo Splendid with her then-husband, Jesse Tobias, whom she met August 1996 when Frente! was supporting Alanis Morissette in Canada. Tobias was Morissette's touring guitarist. Hart and Tobias were married on 22 March 1997 in Austin, Texas. 

As Splendid, the duo released their debut album, Have You Got a Name for It, on 11 October 1999 in Australia. Due to the collapse of their US record company, Mammoth Records, immediately prior to the album's US release date, Have You Got a Name for It was never released outside of Australia. 

In 2002, Hart recorded and performed the song "Blue" for the episode "Conversations with Dead People" of the television show Buffy the Vampire Slayer.  The song was co-written by Hart with the show's creator, Joss Whedon.  As part of Splendid, Hart twice appeared on the show, performing Splendid's songs "Charge" and "You and Me".  Splendid's song "Tomorrow We'll Wake" was also aired on Buffy as background music to a scene featuring characters Xander and Anya. She also sang backing vocals on Tara's song, "Under Your Spell"  in the musical episode "Once More, with Feeling", of which Tobias was co-music director.

Hart also appeared in Joss Whedon's short-lived TV series Firefly, playing the part of Lucy in "Heart of Gold". This part required Hart to perform "Amazing Grace" a cappella.

A second album was being produced but Hart and Tobias separated in September 2004 and later divorced. In December 2004 an EP, States of Awake was released, featuring six of these recordings. 

Hart returned to Australia and in January 2005 Frente! reformed to perform some Australian concerts. The line-up of Austin, Hart and McDonald were joined by Peter Luscombe on drums. The group issued a three-track EP, Try to Think Less, on Pop Boomerang Records. Later in 2005, Hart became a member of the band Holidays on Ice, a project by Dean Manning, formerly of Leonardo's Bride.

2006-present: Solo career
In 2006, Hart relocated to Melbourne where she began work on her solo career. She appeared on Four Hours Sleep's second album Love Specifics, released in November 2006, where she again joined Bill McDonald, Stephen Cummings, and the Luscombe brothers.

Hart's debut solo single "Pictures of You" was released on Level Two Music. In 2007, Hart released "Cold Heart Killer", the lead single from her debut album, Grounded Bird released in September 2007 on ABC Music.

On 23 October 2009, Hart reeled her second studio album Eat My Shadow. At the ARIA Music Awards of 2010, the album was nominated for ARIA Award for Best Adult Contemporary Album.

Hart appeared on SBS One rock quiz show Rockwiz on 2 October 2010.

In March 2014, Four Hours Sleep released their eponymous third album featuring Hart, Cummings, McDonald, and the Luscombe brothers.

Hart appeared on ABC news satire show The Weekly with Charlie Pickering on 12 August 2015 singing the song "Hey Boy" with Miranda Tapsell and Geraldine Quinn.

In 2018, Hart was featured on the Ben Mastwyk single "Happiness".

Discography

Studio albums

Singles

Other appearances

References

1972 births
Living people
Musicians from Adelaide
Hart, Angie
21st-century Australian singers
21st-century Australian women singers
Frente! members